For the Ride Home is the debut album of singer Josh Kelley. It was re-released in 2004 with different artwork and a bonus disc. The album peaked at #159 on the Billboard 200 album chart and #5 on the Top Heatseekers Chart.

Track listing

For the Short Ride Home
For the Short Ride Home is a digital-only release that includes the four songs from the second disc of the re-release. It was first made available on October 19, 2004.

Singles

Personnel
John Alagía – acoustic guitar, electric guitar, synthesizer strings
Michael Andrews – banjo, lap steel guitar, ukulele
Mark Bryant – mandolin
Tom Freund – bass guitar
Matt Johnson – drums
Josh Kelley – dobro, acoustic guitar, electric guitar, keyboards, lead vocals, background vocals
Ben Peeler – banjo, lap steel guitar

Charts

References

2003 debut albums
Josh Kelley albums
Albums produced by John Alagía